Antony Peattie is a British music writer. He co-edited the 1997 revision of The New Kobbé's Opera Book, with Lord Harewood.

Career
Peattie was publications editor at Welsh National Opera, before leaving to help launch Opera Now magazine, and then going freelance, creating Opera Bites for Glyndebourne, surtitles for Scottish Opera and supertitles for the Royal Opera.

Personal life
For around 25 years, Peattie lived with the artist Sir Howard Hodgkin until Hodgkin's death in March 2017. They lived in a four-storey Georgian house in Bloomsbury, near the British Museum.

Selected publications
The Private Life of Lord Byron
The New Kobbé's Opera Book, (1997 revision), edited with Lord Harewood, New York: G. P. Putnam's Sons. London: Ebury Press.

References

Living people
British writers about music
Year of birth missing (living people)